Scopodes is a genus of beetles in the family Carabidae and is found in Australia, New Zealand, Indonesia and Papua New Guinea. The genus contains the following species:

 Scopodes adonis Darlington, 1968 
 Scopodes aeneus Macleay, 1871 
 Scopodes altus Darlington, 1968 
 Scopodes amplipennis Baehr, 1995 
 Scopodes angulicollis Macleay, 1871 
 Scopodes arfakensis Baehr, 2010 
 Scopodes aspericollis Baehr, 1994 
 Scopodes aterrimus Chaudoir, 1872 
 Scopodes atricornis Baehr, 1994 
 Scopodes balkei Baehr, 1995 
 Scopodes basalis Broun, 1893 
 Scopodes bicolor Baehr, 1994 
 Scopodes boops Erichson, 1842
 Scopodes bryophilus Broun, 1886 
 Scopodes caeruleus Baehr, 1994 
 Scopodes caledonicus Fauvel, 1903 
 Scopodes chalceus Baehr, 1994 
 Scopodes cheesmannae Darlington, 1968 
 Scopodes chimbu Darlington, 1968 
 Scopodes cognatus Broun, 1886 
 Scopodes cuprascens Baehr, 1994 
 Scopodes darlingtoni Baehr, 1994 
 Scopodes denticollis Macleay, 1864
 Scopodes edwardsii Bates, 1878 
 Scopodes flavipes Blackburn, 1894
 Scopodes fossulatus (Blanchard, 1843) 
 Scopodes foveipennis Baehr, 1994 
 Scopodes griffithi Sloane, 1903
 Scopodes hornabrooki Baehr, 1998 
 Scopodes intermedius Blackburn, 1894 
 Scopodes interruptus Baehr, 1998 
 Scopodes intricatus Blackburn, 1895 
 Scopodes irregularis Andrewes, 1933 
 Scopodes laevifrons Baehr, 1994 
 Scopodes laevigatus Bates, 1878 
 Scopodes laevis Macleay, 1871
 Scopodes levistriatus Broun, 1886 
 Scopodes louwerensi Baehr, 1994 
 Scopodes minor Baehr, 1994 
 Scopodes muliae Baehr, 1995 
 Scopodes multipunctatus Bates, 1878 
 Scopodes ocellatus Moore, 1963
 Scopodes ovalis Moore, 1992
 Scopodes perfoveatus Baehr, 1995 
 Scopodes perignitus Baehr, 1998 
 Scopodes peterseni Louwerens, 1969 
 Scopodes prasinus Bates, 1878 
 Scopodes pustulatus Broun, 1882 
 Scopodes regularis Baehr, 1994 
 Scopodes reticulatus Baehr, 1994 
 Scopodes riedeli Baehr, 1994 
 Scopodes robustus Baehr, 1994 
 Scopodes rufipes Baehr, 1994 
 Scopodes rugatus Blackburn, 1894
 Scopodes schoenhuberi Baehr, 1999 
 Scopodes sigillatus Germar, 1848
 Scopodes simplex Blackburn, 1894
 Scopodes splendens Moore, 1963
 Scopodes striaticollis Baehr, 1994 
 Scopodes tafa Darlington, 1968 
 Scopodes tasmanicus Bates, 1878 
 Scopodes tripunctatus Chaudoir, 1852
 Scopodes tristis Baehr, 1994 
 Scopodes versicolor Bates, 1878 
 Scopodes violaceus Baehr, 1994 
 Scopodes virescens Baehr, 1994 
 Scopodes viridiaeneus Baehr, 1994 
 Scopodes wei R.T & J.R.Bell, 1989 
 Scopodes wilsoni Darlington, 1968

References

Lebiinae
Beetles of Australia
Beetles of New Zealand
Insects of Southeast Asia